Kansas City University (KCU) is a private medical school with its main campus in Kansas City, Missouri and an additional campus in Joplin, Missouri.  Founded in 1916, KCU is one of the original osteopathic medical schools in the United States. It consists of both a College of Osteopathic Medicine and a College of Biosciences. KCU is one of the largest medical schools in the nation by enrollment.

In 2017, KCU began welcoming medical students onto the new Farber-MacIntire campus, in Joplin, Missouri. The university is also currently in the process of developing and constructing a College of Dental Medicine on their Joplin campus, scheduled to open in Fall 2022.

KCU is accredited by the Higher Learning Commission and recognized by the Coordinating Board of Higher Education for the Missouri Department of Higher Education.  The College of Osteopathic Medicine is accredited by the American Osteopathic Association's Commission on Osteopathic College Accreditation.

History 
KCU opened in May 1916 as the Kansas City College of Osteopathy and Surgery.  At the time, it was the fifth osteopathic medical school to be established.  In January 1921, the college moved its campus to the Northeast neighborhood, just east of downtown Kansas City.  In 1940, the Kansas City College of Osteopathy and Surgery took over the assets of the Central College of Osteopathy in Kansas City, Missouri.

In November 1970, the name of the college was changed to the Kansas City College of Osteopathic Medicine, and again in July 1980 to the University of Health Sciences.  In 1999, KCU joined with seven other research institutions to form the Kansas City Area Life Sciences Institute.  As a founding partner, KCU has provided biomedical research opportunities within the greater Kansas City area.

In 2004, the College of Biosciences opened and the university's name was changed to Kansas City University of Medicine and Biosciences.  The first students in the College of Biosciences began coursework in the fall of 2005, working towards a one-year master's degree in biomedical sciences.  The College of Biosciences later expanded the program to a two-year master's degree.  In 2008, the college began offering a Master of Arts in bioethics.

In 2009, the president of the university, Karen Pletz, pursued the possibility of offering a dual DO-MD degree.  The idea of a dual DO-MD degree was very controversial and raised concerns within the osteopathic medical community.  Several leaders of the profession formally requested the option be abandoned.  Pletz was subsequently fired, but refrained from discussing the details of her dismissal as a lawsuit was underway. The lawsuit and firing related to financial disagreements between Pletz and the university.  Later that day, Pletz filed a countersuit against the school for alleged wrongful termination. Pletz was indicted by federal prosecutors on March 31, 2011 for embezzling $1.5 million from KCU.  Pletz committed suicide on November 22, 2011, in Fort Lauderdale, Florida, before the case went to trial.

In January 2014, the university announced a $60 million expansion plan which included a clinical training center, offices, classrooms, and a medical simulation building.  As part of this expansion, the university began construction of the Center for Medical Education Innovation (CMEI) on the Kansas City Campus in 2018. This $33 million dollar, 56,000 sq. foot facility includes standardized patient exam rooms, a skills simulation deck similar to many hospital environments, and an advanced osteopathic skills lab. The CMEI opened in 2020.

In 2016, the university broke ground on a new medical campus in Joplin, Missouri, to house a second College of Osteopathic Medicine. The first class of medical students on the Joplin Campus began instruction in 2017. The university is currently expanding the Joplin Campus to include a College of Dental Medicine which is scheduled to welcome its first class in 2022.

The Kansas City Campus occupies the original site of Children's Mercy Hospital. In 2020, the university changed its name to "Kansas City University."

Academics 
KCU offers graduate degrees in osteopathic medicine, biomedical sciences, clinical psychology, business, and bioethics. It is accredited by the Higher Learning Commission of the North Central Association of Colleges and Schools and recognized by the Coordinating Board of Higher Education for the Missouri Department of Higher Education. The College of Osteopathic Medicine is accredited by the American Osteopathic Association's Commission on Osteopathic College Accreditation.

College of Osteopathic Medicine 
Founded in 1916 as the university's inaugural program, the College of Osteopathic Medicine confers the Doctor of Osteopathic Medicine (DO) degree.

The College of Osteopathic Medicine is one of three medical schools in the United States to be recognized twice with the John Templeton Foundation's Spirituality in Medicine Curricular Award, which recognizes outstanding medical education curricula incorporating spirituality in medicine. KCU is also one of three osteopathic medical schools nationwide working to enhance future physicians’ cultural competency and eliminate disparities in health care through a grant from the American Medical Student Association.

The curriculum at KCU's College of Osteopathic Medicine consists of four years of structured training. Training includes didactic learning and standardized patient encounters. The first two years are organized in a modified systems, clinical application-based curriculum. Each system is repeated in years one and two. The first year focuses on normal structure and function, while the second year focuses on disease processes and clinical presentation.  Throughout years one and two, students have early clinical exposure in the curriculum through participation in Score 1 for Health, standardized patient encounters, and human patient simulation. During years three and four, students are matched with a preceptor or at a hospital/ward at a KCU-affiliated clerkship site in various specialties of medicine and surgery.

Students at KCU's College of Osteopathic Medicine also partner with local health organizations during the first and second year. First and second year students can apply to be student doctors and scribes, working with attending physicians, at KC Care Health Center, a local clinic providing health services to financially underserved populations in Kansas City, MO.

Third and fourth year students complete clerkships at hospitals.

The school has an early matriculation program, called the Partners Program, with several undergraduate institutions. In this program, students can apply to KCU in their sophomore year of college and be accepted by their junior year.

Dual Degree Programs 
The College of Osteopathic Medicine offers dual-degree programs including a DO/Master of Arts in Bioethics and a DO/MBA in Health Care Leadership, which is offered through a partnership with Rockhurst University’s Helzberg School of Management. Dual-degree students complete both programs in four years and graduate with other members of their KCU class.

College of Biosciences 
The College of Biosciences was established in 2005 and currently offers two degrees including a Master of Science of Biomedical Sciences and a Master of Arts in Bioethics.

Clinical Psychology Doctoral Program
KCU's Clinical Psychology Doctoral (PsyD) Program is a five-year, practice-oriented program. Students are exposed to a broad base of discipline-specific knowledge and trained in profession-wide competencies set by the American Psychological Association. KCU offers the only PsyD program in Missouri or Kansas.

College of Dental Medicine (in progress)
KCU is in the process of building a College of Dental Medicine on the KCU-Joplin campus, scheduled to begin classes in June 2023.

Campuses

KCU-Kansas City Campus 

The KCU campus is located on a 23 acres and consists of 13 buildings.

The Administration Building, the prior site of Children's Mercy Hospital, houses the administrative offices and support facilities.

The Annex Building consists primarily of classroom space. The D'Angelo Library opened in the spring of 2011 and includes a learning resources center, collection and reference rooms, several training and conference rooms, an audio-visual/multimedia room, a special collections room, and group study rooms and numerous offices for library support personnel.  The library was named for Vincent D'Angelo, D.O. (class of 1957) and his wife, Cleo D'Angelo.  The Leonard Smith Hall houses more than 50 individual and small-group study rooms, a computer lab, student lounge, and a Bioethics classroom.  The Mary Lou Butterworth, D.O., Alumni Center is a meeting center for students, faculty, and alumni.

The Dybedal Center for Research is the focus of research activities at KCU. Opened in 2004, the Dybedal Center includes an  clinical research center, the only adult academic clinical research center in Kansas City that conducts Phase I-IV studies.

The Kesselheim Center for Clinical Competence was completed in 2006 and provides a facility for patient simulations for first and second year medical students, both human "standardized patients" and technological simulations.

The Strickland Education Pavilion opened in 1996 and houses anatomy and OMT laboratories a 250-seat auditorium, a cafeteria, and meeting rooms.

The Student Activities Center, which opened in early 2011, includes a student lounge, Common Grounds Cafe, meetings and conference rooms, campus store, a multi-dimensional fitness center with cardiovascular and weight training equipment, an aerobics facility, and game room.  The building is connected to the Academic Center, which was formerly the Weaver Auditorium, a 1,500-seat auditorium, which opened in 2007. The Academic Center houses two lecture halls with a combined seating capacity of more than 600.The Center for Medical Education Innovation (CMEI) is a 56,000-square-foot building that opened in Fall 2020, providing medical students simulated clinical experiences using virtual reality and augmented reality technologies. CMEI also houses ICU simulation sites, medical robots, 22 standardized patient rooms, and a 70-bay lab for physical diagnosis, and osteopathic manipulative medicine (OMM).

Joplin Farber-McIntire Campus (KCU-Joplin) 
KCU enrolled its first class at the KCU-Joplin campus, in Joplin, Missouri, which began classes in the fall of 2017.

A new College of Dental Medicine is currently under construction at the Joplin campus, and is scheduled to open in June 2023.

The KCU-Joplin campus features a 150,000-square-foot building on approximately 40 acres of land.

Students

There were students 1,266 enrolled for the 2019-2020 year. There were students 1,334 enrolled for the 2016-2017 year. There were 1,106 students enrolled for the 2015-16 academic year.  For the 2019-2020 academic year, about 44 percent of KCU students are female.

Students on campus participate in a number of clubs, some of which include: 
 American College of Osteopathic Family Physicians (ACOFP)
 American Medical Association
 DOCARE International
 Latter-day Saint Student Association (LDSSA)
 Sigma Sigma Phi
 Student Osteopathic Medical Association (SOMA)
 Student Osteopathic Surgical Association (SOSA)
 Gold Humanism Honor Society (GHHS)

Score 1 for Health 
Score 1 for Health is a non-profit organization that administers free, comprehensive health screenings to elementary-aged children living in Kansas City's urban core and the Joplin, MO community. The program gives students hands-on clinical training during their first and second year of medical school. The program screens up to 13,000 children for vision, dental, hearing, blood pressure, height/weight and more every year. Registered nurses follow up with children who have a referral and their families to connect them to health resources in the community.

People
Since 1916, more than 10,500 students have graduated from KCU.

Notable alumni
Of KCU osteopathic physician alumni, about 70 percent practice primary care medicine, and 40 percent practice in rural settings.
 Alan Bates, an Oregon politician.
 Earle Haas, osteopathic physician and inventor of the tampon with an applicator, marketed as "Tampax."
 Reef Karim, writer, host, television personality, and medical advisor for several movies and television shows.
 Joel Weisman, one of the first to identify AIDS.
 Phog Allen, an American basketball and baseball player, coach of American football, basketball, and baseball.
 Leonard Calabrese, is credited with being one of the early pioneers of HIV research. Currently a physician at the famed Cleveland Clinic, he received a $3 million grant in 2010 to continue his research.
 Stephen Typaldos, an osteopathic physician who developed the Fascial Distortion Model, a type of osteopathic manipulative medicine.
 Jim Neely, Republican legislator in the Missouri House of Representatives.
 Karen J. Nichols, former medical school dean at Midwestern University, and chair of the board of directors of the Accreditation Council for Graduate Medical Education.
 Scott Ransom, a Partner in the Health & Life Sciences Advisory with Oliver Wyman; past president of the University of North Texas Health Science Center.

References

External links
 

Medical schools in Missouri
Osteopathic medical schools in the United States
Universities and colleges in Kansas City, Missouri
Educational institutions established in 1916
Private universities and colleges in Missouri
1916 establishments in Missouri